Basiothia charis, the lesser brown striped hawk, is a moth of the family Sphingidae. The species was first described by Francis Walker in 1856. It is fairly common in most habitats, excluding very dry areas, throughout Africa south of the Sahara. It has not been recorded from Madagascar.

The length of the forewings is 22–25 mm. The head and body are golden brown with a double gold dorsal line. The forewings are golden reddish-brown with a straight whitish line from the middle of the inner margin to the apex. There are two parallel darker straight lines near the outer margin. The ground colour is interrupted by whitish streaks along the veins inside the whitish line. The hindwings are crimson with a narrow brown border.

The larvae possibly feed on Vernonia species.

References

Basiothia
Moths described in 1856
Moths of Africa